Denwin Aldrige Keith Farmer (born 19 September 1996) is a South African soccer player who plays as a centre-back or as a left-back for Sekhukhune United in the Premier Soccer League.

He started his senior career in SuperSport United. He was born in Port Elizabeth.

International career
He has played for the South Africa national under-23 team at the 2015 Africa U-23 Cup of Nations.

He made his debut for South Africa national soccer team on 10 June 2021 in a friendly against Uganda.

References

External links

1996 births
Living people
South African soccer players
South Africa international soccer players
Association football defenders
SuperSport United F.C. players
Maritzburg United F.C. players
Baroka F.C. players
Sekhukhune United F.C. players
South African Premier Division players
Sportspeople from Port Elizabeth
Soccer players from the Eastern Cape